HMS Panther was a 50-gun fourth rate ship of the line of the Royal Navy, built at Plymouth Dockyard to the dimensions specified in the 1741 proposals of the 1719 Establishment, and launched on 24 June 1746.

Panther served until 1756, when she was broken up.

Notes

References

Lavery, Brian (2003) The Ship of the Line - Volume 1: The development of the battlefleet 1650-1850. Conway Maritime Press. .

Ships of the line of the Royal Navy
1746 ships